The Château de la Faye in Saint-Sulpice-de-Mareuil, France, is an 18th-century French château built by the enlargement of a 16th-century structure, in Saint-Sulpice-de-Mareuil in the Dordogne département, France.

References

Châteaux in Dordogne
Monuments historiques of Dordogne